The 2010 Aberto de Bahia was a professional tennis tournament played on outdoor hard courts. It was the first (and to date only) edition of the tournament which is part of the 2010 ATP Challenger Tour. It took place in Salvador, Brazil between 16 and 22 August 2010.

ATP entrants

Seeds

 Rankings are as of August 9, 2010.

Other entrants
The following players received wildcards into the singles main draw:
  Guilherme Clézar
  Rogério Dutra da Silva
  Tiago Lopes
  Daniel Silva

The following players received entry from the qualifying draw:
  Chen Ti
  Robert Farah
  Toshihide Matsui
  Nicholas Monroe

Champions

Singles

 Ricardo Mello def.  Thiago Alves, 5–7, 6–4, 6–4

Doubles

 Franco Ferreiro /  André Sá def.  Uladzimir Ignatik /  Martin Kližan, 6–2, 6–4

External links
ITF Search 

2010 ATP Challenger Tour
Tennis tournaments in Brazil
2010 in Brazilian tennis
Sport in Salvador, Bahia